Ju Reti (born 19 September 1983) is a former Chinese professional snooker player.

Career

Amateur

2012/2013
Ju, a farmer, from the Xinjiang region China of the Uyghur ethnic group started to enter Asian Players Tour Championship when they were introduced in the 2012/2013 season, entering in Event 2, where he lost to Mark Williams in the last 64 and Event 3 where he reached the last 16 stage as he lost to Li Hang, over these two events Ju won four matches and won £1,500 in prize money as he was ranked 37th in the Asian Order of Merit.

2013/2014
The following season, Ju entered in all four of the Asian Tour Events in the 2013/2014 season, reaching the last 32 of the 2013 Yixing Open, where he also scored his first century break. In the 2013 Zhangjiagang Open, Ju managed to reach the final where he faced Michael Holt and Ju became the first amateur winner of a Player Tour Event, after a 4–1 win over Holt, he won £10,000 in prize money and made the highest break of the tournament with 142. In the final two Asian Events of the season, Ju reached the last 32 of the 2013 Zhengzhou Open and the last 16 of the 2014 Dongguan Open, these results netted Ju £12,200 in prize money and was ranked 2nd in the Asian Order of Merit which gained him qualification the 2014 Players Championship Grand Finals and a two-year card of the professional snooker tour for the 2014–15 and 2015–16 seasons. At the Players Championship Grand Finals, Ju took the first frame against Judd Trump with a break of 75 in the last 32 stage, but lost 4–1 at the event held at Preston's Guild Hall.

Professional
Ju only played in the three Asian Tour events in the 2014–15 season. A pair of last 32 exits saw him finish 30th on the Order of Merit.
He only played in the Haining Open the following year, losing 4–0 in the first round, and has now dropped off the tour.

Performance and rankings timeline

Career finals

Minor-ranking finals: 1 (1 title)

References

External links
Ju Reti at worldsnooker.com

1983 births
Place of birth unknown
Uyghur sportspeople
Chinese people of Uyghur descent
Living people
Sportspeople from Xinjiang
Chinese snooker players
People from Bortala